Pandit Ramdas Palsule (born 30 March 1963) is an internationally-acclaimed Tabla virtuoso from Pune, India. He is also an A grade artist of All India Radio and Doordarshan.

Early life 

Ramdas was born in well-educated family in Pune. His father Dr. G. B. Palsule was a recipient of the prestigious President’s Award, Kalidas Puraskar, K.K. Birla Award and many more for his work in Sanskrit literature and for his Sanskrit epic – ‘Vainaayakam’ on Swaatantryaveer Savarkar.

Ramdas is an alumnus of prestigious alma-maters like Jnana Prabodhini Prashala and College of Engineering, Pune (COEP). He was introduced to Tabla by Pt. G. L. Samant in his school days. After achieving his Bachelor’s Degree in Mechanical Engineering, he chose his passion over an assured career in engineering at the age of twenty-three. He became a disciple of Tabla Maestro Taalyogi Pt. Suresh Talwalkar. With his natural ingenuity, relentless toil, he made strides as an acclaimed soloist and a versatile accompanist.

Career

As a solo artist, Ramdas developed his own style of presenting traditional compositions with a new perspective and fresh thought-process. He mastered the craft of “Jod-Taal” and “Jaati-Bhed” and earned the praise of connoisseurs and patriarchs alike with his refreshingly vivid style of presentation and with his trademark subtle contemporary touch. Ramdas is aptly known in the music fraternity as a riyaazi (hard-working) musician. 

Apart from being a proficient solo performer, Ramdas also proved his dexterity as a versatile accompanist with vocalists, instrumentalists and dancers from both Hindustani and Carnatic styles of Classical Music. Doyens like Pandit Jitendra Abhisheki, Pandit Jasraj, Vidushi Prabha Atre, Pandit Shivkumar Sharma, Pandit Hariprasad Chaurasia, Pandit Birju Maharaj, Ustad Sultan Khan, Begum Parveen Sultana, Ustad Amjad Ali Khan, Vidwan L. Subramanyam, Vidwan M. Balamuralikrishna, Ustad Shahid Parvez Khan, Pandit Vishwa Mohan Bhatt, Pandit Ulhas Kashalkar,  Pandit Venkatesh Kumar, Pandit Ronu Majumdar and many more have trusted him as their co-artist for concerts, the world over. Ramdas has also shared stage with eminent musicians from the South Indian (Carnatic) music tradition, such as Kadri Gopalnath, Mysore Nagraj and Mysore Manjunath, Sridhar Parthasarathy, Kumaresh Rajagopalan, Jayanthi Kumaresh and many more.

One of the greatest honors Ramdas received was to perform solo at the Barsi of Ustad Alla Rakha Khansaheb in February 2018. He has enthralled audiences with his enchanting solo performances as well as accompaniments at prestigious concerts like Sawai Gandharva Sangeet Mahotsav (Pune), Saptak Festival (Ahmedabad), national music conferences of the All India Radio, SPIC MACAY, Isha Foundation’s Yaksha 2020, Dussehra Festival (Mysuru), All Bengal Festival (Kolkata), Tansen Mahotsav (Gwalior), Kalidas Festival (Ujjain), Pt. Abhisheki Mahotsav (Goa) and many more. He has also performed in countries like USA, Canada, UK, Germany, Switzerland, Austria, Australia, many African countries, Singapore, Malaysia, Indonesia and the Gulf. He is a Guru at The Lalit Kala Kendra Center for Performing Arts of University of Pune since 1995, and at Bharti Vidyapeeth School of Performing Arts since 2008.

Since 2001, Ramdas has been arranging concerts and propagating Hindustani Classical Music in North America and Europe. Consequently, music aficionados in the US have been treated to the performances of many upcoming and established musicians hailing from the Hindustani and Carnatic traditions.

He is an empaneled musician of ICCR since 1988 and a committee member of CFPGS (Cultural Functions and Production Grant Scheme) of Ministry of Culture, Government of India since 2018.

As a Guru 
Ramdas is a founder member and a Guru at Avartan Gurukul - a unique institution for studying Hindustani music in Pune, India. His rich educational background helps him understand the nuances of the pedagogical aspects of Hindustani music. Ramdas is ably carrying forward his Guru Pandit Suresh Talwalkar ji's legacy by imparting knowledge to music students through the Guru-Shishya tradition, without any remuneration, for which his Guru feels proud of him. Students from all over India and abroad have been learning from him, many of whom have made their mark in the field of Classical Music as performers. Saleel Tambe (UK), Harshad Kanetkar (USA), Nikhil Harishchandrakar (Australia), Ganesh Tanawade, Einav Baram (Israel), Pablo Llambias (Chile) and many more of his students are spread across the globe.

Ramdas strongly believes that art and art education must be ingrained with Sanskaar, and not merely be transfer of information. He insists on nourishing and nurturing students not only as capable musicians, but also as cultured and responsible citizens. This only underlines his dedication and devotion towards the cause of Indian Classical Music and his genuine urge to make a difference to the society at large. He is also teaching Tabla to a few differently-abled students for several years and is an inspiration for his students and other gurus alike.

Social Work 
Every year since 2001, Ramdas has been organizing a Blood Donation Camp in his home city, Pune. In collaboration with Rotary Club of Pune Westend, and Maharashtra Mandal (Bay Area, USA), he has helped raise funds for musicians affected economically due to Covid-19 Pandemic under project “Saath”. He was also one of the organizers/performers of a fund-raiser concert “Artist for Artist” for instrument-makers in the flood-affected areas of Sangli and Kolhapur.

Notable concerts in India

 Sawai Gandharva Bhimsen Festival
 Barsi of Ustad Allah Rakha Khansaheb (2018)
 Saptak Annual Music Festival
 All India Radio
 Isha Foundation’s Yaksha 2020
 Dussehra Festival (Mysuru)
 Tansen Mahotsav, Gwalior
 Kalidas Festival, Ujjain
 Performances for SPIC MACAY
 All Bengal Festival, Kolkata
 Surashri Kerkar Sangeet Samoroh, Goa (सूरश्री केरकर संगीत समारोह)
 Balgandharva Sangit Festival, Jalgaon (बालगंधर्व संगीत महोत्सव)
 Kala Sangit Mahotsav (कला-संगीत महोत्सव)
 Manhar Sangeet Sabha, Pune (मनहर संगीत सभा)

References

Hindustani instrumentalists
Living people
Musicians from Pune
Tabla players
1963 births